Szentmarjay Tibor Városi Stadion is a sports stadium in Eger, Hungary. The stadium is a home to the famous association football side Egri FC. The stadium has a capacity of 6,000.

Attendance

Records
Record Attendance:
 18,000 Egri Dózsa v Ferencváros, May 14, 1967

External links 
Magyarfutball.hu 

Football venues in Hungary